Collin Smith (born December 4, 2003) is an American soccer player who plays as a right-back for Birmingham Legion on loan from Major League Soccer club FC Dallas.

Career

North Texas
Smith made his league debut for the club on July 25, 2020, coming on as a late substitute for Beni Redžić in a 2–1 home victory over Forward Madison.

FC Dallas
On April 28, 2021, Smith signed as a homegrown player with FC Dallas.

Smith was loaned to USL Championship side Birmingham Legion on March 10, 2023.

References

External links
Collin Smith at FC Dallas
Collin Smith at US Soccer Development Academy

2003 births
Living people
American soccer players
FC Dallas players
North Texas SC players
Birmingham Legion FC players
Association football defenders
Homegrown Players (MLS)
MLS Next Pro players
Soccer players from Jacksonville, Florida
Soccer players from Texas
USL League One players